Richmond Public Library may refer to:

 Richmond Public Library (Canada), a public library in Richmond, British Columbia
 Richmond Public Library (United States), a public library in Richmond, Virginia
 Richmond Public Library,  a public library in Richmond, Rhode Island

See also
 Richmond Memorial Library, Batavia, New York